Danylo Leonidovych Beskorovaynyi (born 7 February 1999) is a Ukrainian professional footballer who currently plays for Kryvbas Kryvyi Rih as a defender.

Club career
Beskorovaynyi is a product of Kryvbas Kryvyi Rih (first trainer Vitaliy Bondaryev) and Youth Sportive School Kharkiv (KhOVUFKS).

MFK Zemplín Michalovce
Beskorovaynyi made his Fortuna Liga debut for Zemplín Michalovce against Senica on 18 August 2018.

Astana loan
On 27 January 20222, Beskorovainyi joined Astana on loan from DAC 1904 for the 2022 season, with the option to make the move permanent. ON 11 December 2022, Astana announced that they had not taken up the offer to make Beskorovainyi's transfer permanent and that his loan deal had expired.

Kryvbas Kryvyi Rih
On 9 January 2023 he signed for Kryvbas Kryvyi Rih.

Honours
Astana
Kazakhstan Premier League: 2022

International
On June 15, 2019 Beskorovaynyi won the FIFA U-20 World Cup, being a part of Ukraine national U-20 team.

Ukraine U20
FIFA U-20 World Cup: 2019

References

External links
 
 
 Futbalnet profile 

1999 births
Living people
Sportspeople from Kryvyi Rih
Association football defenders
Ukrainian footballers
Ukrainian expatriate footballers
Ukraine youth international footballers
FC Volyn Lutsk players
FK Atlantas players
FC DAC 1904 Dunajská Streda players
MFK Zemplín Michalovce players
FC Astana players
FC Kryvbas Kryvyi Rih players
Ukrainian First League players
A Lyga players
Slovak Super Liga players
Kazakhstan Premier League players
Expatriate footballers in Lithuania
Expatriate footballers in Slovakia
Expatriate footballers in Kazakhstan
Ukrainian expatriate sportspeople in Lithuania
Ukrainian expatriate sportspeople in Slovakia
Ukrainian expatriate sportspeople in Kazakhstan